Werner Kerth (born 7 December 1966) is an Austrian ice hockey player. He competed in the men's tournaments at the 1988 Winter Olympics and the 1994 Winter Olympics.

References

External links
 

1966 births
Living people
Austrian ice hockey players
Olympic ice hockey players of Austria
Ice hockey players at the 1988 Winter Olympics
Ice hockey players at the 1994 Winter Olympics
People from Kapfenberg
Sportspeople from Styria
20th-century Austrian people